The Mediterranean Region generally refers to the Mediterranean Basin

Mediterranean Region may also refer to:

Mediterranean Region, Turkey, a region of Turkey
Mediterranean Region (statistical), a statistical region of Turkey
Euro-Mediterranean region